The Department of Finance (DoF, Ulster-Scots: Männystrie o Siller) is a devolved Northern Ireland government department in the Northern Ireland Executive. The minister with overall responsibility for the department is the Minister for Finance.

The department was previously called the Department of Finance and Personnel (DFP) before its name change on 9 May 2016.

Aim
DoF's overall aim is to help the Northern Ireland Executive "secure the most appropriate and effective use of resources and services for the benefit of the community".

The incumbent Minister is Conor Murphy.

Responsibilities
The department is responsible for the following policy areas:
 finance
 the Northern Ireland Civil Service
 land and property
 building regulation
 procurement
 civil law reform
 civil registration

Some financial matters are reserved to Westminster and are therefore not devolved: 

 financial services
 financial markets

In addition, some matters are excepted and were not intended for devolution:
 taxation
 currency

DoF's main counterparts in the United Kingdom Government are:
 HM Treasury;
 the Cabinet Office (on civil service matters);
 the Ministry of Justice (on civil law reform);
 the Department for Communities and Local Government (on building regulation);
 HM Land Registry (on land registration).

In the Irish Government, the main counterparts are:
 the Department of Finance;
 the Department of Public Expenditure, National Development Plan Delivery and Reform;
 the Department of Justice (on civil law reform and land registration);
 the Department of Housing, Local Government and Heritage (on building regulation).

History
A Ministry of Finance was established on the formation of Northern Ireland in June 1921.  A finance ministry also existed in the 1974 Northern Ireland Executive and became known as the Department of Finance and Personnel under direct rule.

Following a referendum on the Belfast Agreement on 23 May 1998 and the granting of royal assent to the Northern Ireland Act 1998 on 19 November 1998, a Northern Ireland Assembly and Northern Ireland Executive were established by the United Kingdom Government under Prime Minister Tony Blair. The process was known as devolution and was set up to return devolved legislative powers to Northern Ireland. DFP is therefore one of six direct rule Northern Ireland departments which continued in existence after devolution in December 1999 by the Northern Ireland Act 1998 and The Departments (Northern Ireland) Order 1999.

A devolved minister first took office on 2 December 1999.  Devolution was suspended for four periods, during which the department came under the responsibility of direct rule ministers from the Northern Ireland Office:
 between 12 February 2000 and 30 May 2000;
 on 11 August 2001;
 on 22 September 2001;
 between 15 October 2002 and 8 May 2007.

Since 8 May 2007, devolution has operated without interruption.

Ministers of Finance

Direct rule ministers
During the periods of suspension, the following ministers of the Northern Ireland Office were responsible for the department:

Adam Ingram (2000)
Ian Pearson (2002–05)
Lord Rooker (2005–06)
David Hanson (2006–07)

See also
Committee for Finance and Personnel
 NIDirect

References

External links
 DFP
 NIDirect
  

Northern Ireland Executive
Environment of Northern Ireland
Northern Ireland